The 2020 Elitettan was the eighth season of the Elitettan, the Swedish women's association football second tier division.
The season started on 14 June 2020 and is expected to end on 8 November 2020.
Umeå IK were the defending champions.

Teams
Fourteen teams contested the league; the nine remaining teams from the previous season, the two relegated teams from the 2019 Damallsvenskan and the three promoted teams from the Division 1.

League table

Results

Top scorers

References

Elitettan seasons
2
Elitettan
Sweden